Rossen is a surname and given name. Notable people with it include:

Surname
Daniel Rossen (born 1982), American singer-songwriter
Kai Rossen, German chemist
Jeff Rossen (born 1976), American television journalist
Ivo Rossen (born 1982), Dutch footballer
Mischa Rossen(born 1972), Dutch sailor
Robert Rossen (1908–1966), American screenwriter, film director, and producer
Stig Rossen (born 1962), Danish singer and actor

Given name
Rossen Petkov
Rossen Milanov

See also
F. W. Andreasen–John Rossen House, historical place in California
Lex van Rossen Award, European musical photography award
Rössen culture, Central European culture of the middle Neolithic
Rossens (disambiguation)